Dipankar Dasgupta is a computer science professor at the University of Memphis, Tennessee. Dasgupta was named a Fellow of the Institute of Electrical and Electronics Engineers (IEEE) in 2015 for his contributions to immunological computation and bio-inspired cyber security.

References

Fellow Members of the IEEE
Living people
Year of birth missing (living people)
Place of birth missing (living people)
American electrical engineers